Max Nacewicz (born June 5, 1993) is a former American linebacker. He first played in the arena football for the Tampa Bay Storm and then internationally in the German Football League for the Saarland Hurricanes. In 2022, He signed with the Barcelona Dragons in the European League of Football but retired in the preseason. 

Nacewicz played college football for the Springfield Pride football program where he was named multiple times All-American.

Early life
Nacewicz was born in Sandy Hook, Connecticut and went to Newtown High School (Connecticut). There he began playing lacrosse and football under the coaching of former NFL player Steve George as a linebacker.

College career
2011 he enrolled at Springfield College and played for the football varsity team. To this day, he holds multiple school records like tackles for loss (41) and sacks (27). Nacewicz graduated 2015 leading his team and was named Liberty League defensive player of the year, as well as a two-time All-American. He also was Cliff Harris Award finalist and D3football.com All-East Region Second Team.

Professional career

Tampa Bay Storm
After going undrafted in the 2015 NFL Draft, he had several workouts with the Montreal Alouettes in the Canadian Football League and Philadelphia Soul but wasn't signed for the regular season. He took an offer of the Tampa Bay Storm for their 2017 season, bringing the team to the ArenaBowl XXX.

Saarland Hurricanes
After his first arena league season, Nacewicz played shortly for the Albany Empire (AFL) before being signed mid-season by the Hurricanes in the GFL 2. With him, the Canes finished 2nd of the GLF 2 south division and missing the promotion to the German Football League top level.

Barcelona Dragons
On April 26, 2022, Nacewicz signed with the Barcelona Dragons for the 2022 European League of Football season. Shortly before the start of the season, Nacewicz announced that he retired from professional football.

Personal life
Nacewicz majored in Applied Exercise Science.

References

External links
Springfield College bio

1993 births
Living people
American football linebackers
Barcelona Dragons (ELF) players
Springfield Pride football players
American expatriate sportspeople in Germany
American expatriate sportspeople in Spain
Players of American football from Connecticut
People from Sandy Hook, Connecticut
American expatriate players of American football